Słonowice is a PKP railway station in Słonowice, Pomeranian Voivodeship, Poland.

It was originally built to serve the estate of Groß Schlönwitz, then the property of the von Blumenthal family.

Lines crossing the station

Train services

The station is served by the following services:
Regional services (R) Słupsk — Miastko
Regional services (R) Słupsk — Miastko — Szczecinek
Regional services (R) Słupsk — Miastko — Szczecinek — Chojnice

References 

Słonowice article at Polish Stations Database, URL accessed at 7 March 2006

Railway stations in Pomeranian Voivodeship
Słupsk County